Purbung (also Putrung) (ID: PURB) is a mountain in the Himalayas of Nepal in the province of Gandaki Pradesh. Located in the Damodar range it has a height of 6,465 m.

Jost Kobusch and Nicolas Scheidtweiler made the first successful ascent on November 30, 2021.

References 

Six-thousanders of the Himalayas
Mountains of the Gandaki Province